From the Cliffs is an EP by multinational indie rock band Guillemots, released on 14 March 2006. It compiles their previous releases, the I Saw Such Things in My Sleep EP and the first "Trains to Brazil" single, to form a mini-album in itself (along with the new opening track, "Sake", and, for the Japanese release, two additional tracks: "Moonlight" and "Pa Moila").

Track listing

References

2006 EPs
Guillemots (band) albums
Fantastic Plastic Records EPs